is a Japanese television drama series.

Plot 
Haru Tezuka's parents run a bar in Kamata, Tokyo. She is honest and bright, but she can't lie, which sometimes causes her to get in trouble. Haru finds it difficult to get a job.

She notices an application guideline from airline company ANA (All Nippon Airways). Haru, who never thought of working in the airline industry, decides to take a test for the airline company. She first attends a company presentation by ANA. There, she sees elite people who have long dreamed of becoming pilots, and airplane enthusiasts. She becomes overwhelmed by them. Haru is indecisive about whether she wants to go through with it, and she barely manages to pass the test. Now, Haru wants to become a pilot, but what awaits her is harsh training.

Cast 
 Maki Horikita as Haru Tezuka
 Saki Aibu as Chisato Oda
 Takumi Saito as Konosuke Kunikida
 Koichi Iwaki as Kazutoyo Shinozaki
 Nanami Sakuraba as Suzu Abeno
 Nanao as Rinko Suzuki
 Shotaro Mamiya as Taiji Kishii
 Yu Koyanagi as Sho Kotori
 Ryusei Fujii as Kazuo Yamada
 Ken Shounozaki as Maya Moroboshi
 Saburo Ishikura as Shigeo Tezuka
 Toshie Negishi  as Yoshimi Tezuka
 Ema Fujisawa as Kanoko Saegusa

Episode Information

References

External links
  
 

Japanese drama television series
Aviation television series